Moamer Kasumović (born 12 December 1981) is a Bosnian and Montenegrin actor and producer.

His first television role was in a film called Summer in the Golden Valley in 2003. However, Kasumović is mostly known for portraying the role of Damir Fazlinović in popular Bosnian sitcom Lud, zbunjen, normalan since 2007. He has also produced the short film Non-Stop Plavi and feature films Hiljadarka and The Life of Flowers.

Filmography

As actor

Film

Television

As producer

Film

As executive producer

Film

References

External links

1981 births
Living people
Bosniaks of Montenegro
People from Bijelo Polje
21st-century Bosnia and Herzegovina male actors
Bosnia and Herzegovina male film actors
Bosnia and Herzegovina male television actors